Francesco Camaldo (born 24 October 1952) is an Italian priest of the Catholic Church, and is currently the assistant of Circolo San Pietro.

Birth
Camaldo was born on 24 October 1952 in Lagonegro, Italy.

Seminarian and priest
After high school, Camaldo was a student in the Roman Seminary and later was ordained priest on 26 June 1976 by Cardinal Vicar Ugo Poletti, Francesco Camaldo also was vicar of the parish of St. Mary of Consolation, Casalbertone in Rome (1976-1990)

Studies
Bachelor of Philosophy and Theology at the Pontifical Lateran University, Bachelor of Spiritual Theology at the Pontifical Gregorian University, Bachelor and Doctor in Sacred Liturgy at the Pontifical Liturgical Institute of San Anselmo.

Jobs in The Roman Curia
The charges that were assigned as follows:

 Chaplain of the Chapel of St. Andrew Corsini for the Honorable Papal Basilica of St. John Lateran (17 January 1988)
 Assistant studies in the Congregation for Divine Worship and the Discipline of the Sacraments (1 January 1993)
 Officer of the Vicariate of Rome (1984-1993)
 Private Secretary to Cardinal Ugo Poletti, from 1984 to 1997 when he died.
 Club Chaplain of St. Peter (22 February 2005)
 Rector of the Chapel of St. Mary of Mercy in the Coliseum (October 10, 2005)

Cardinal Camillo Ruini, Vicar General of His Holiness for the city of Rome, appointed Mons. Camaldo:
 Club Chaplain of St. Peter (22 February 2005)
 Dean of the Chapel of St. Mary of Mercy in the Coliseum (October 10, 2005)
Dean of Pontifical Ceremonies

Francesco Camaldo was also Prelate of Honor of His Holiness and Master of Ceremonies (27 June 1984). Dean of the masters of Papal Ceremonies.

Conclave of 2005
Dean of the masters of Papal Ceremonies, Monsignor Camaldo appeared repeatedly in the events of the funeral of John Paul II and the election of Benedict XVI. Amongst these were the wake of the pope's funeral, the Pro Eligendo Romano Pontifice mass, the conclave and the Habemus Papam.

External links
 Official Website

1952 births
People from Lagonegro
21st-century Italian Roman Catholic priests
Living people
Pontifical Roman Seminary alumni
Pontifical Lateran University alumni
Pontifical Gregorian University alumni